The 2020–21 Miami Hurricanes men's basketball team represented the University of Miami during the 2020–21 NCAA Division I men's basketball season. Led by tenth-year head coach Jim Larrañaga, they played their home games at the Watsco Center on the university's campus in Coral Gables, Florida as members of the Atlantic Coast Conference (ACC).

The Hurricanes finished the season 10–17, 4–15 in ACC play to finish in thirteenth place.  In the ACC tournament they defeated Pittsburgh in the first round, and Clemson in the second round, before losing to eventual champions Georgia Tech in the quarterfinals.  They were not invited to either the NCAA tournament or NIT.

Previous season
The Hurricanes finished the 2019–20 season 15–16, 7–13 in ACC play to finish in a tie for tenth place. They lost to Clemson in the second round of the ACC tournament.  The tournament was cancelled before the Quarterfinals due to the COVID-19 pandemic.  The NCAA tournament and NIT were also cancelled due to the pandemic.

Offseason

Departures

Incoming transfers

2020 recruiting class

Roster

Source:

Schedule and results
Source:

|-
!colspan=12 style=| Regular season

|-
!colspan=12 style=| ACC tournament

Rankings

*AP does not release post-NCAA Tournament rankings

References

Miami Hurricanes men's basketball seasons
Miami
Miami Hurricanes men's basketball team
Miami Hurricanes men's basketball team